Events in the year 1985 in Bulgaria.

Incumbents 

 General Secretaries of the Bulgarian Communist Party: Todor Zhivkov
 Chairmen of the Council of Ministers: Grisha Filipov

Events 

 November 4-30 – The Expo 85 took place in Plovdiv, Bulgaria and had the theme "The creations of young inventors". It was second one to be held in Plovdiv.

Births 
 20 October – Zhana Bergendorff, singer

Deaths

References 

 
1980s in Bulgaria
Years of the 20th century in Bulgaria
Bulgaria
Bulgaria